Eligius Fromentin (1767October 6, 1822) was an American politician.

Fromentin was born and raised in France, where he later became a Jesuit Roman Catholic priest. Fromentin fled the country during the French Revolution and arrived in the United States. He at first settled in Pennsylvania, but then moved to Maryland, where he was a schoolteacher and a priest. By the early 19th century, Fromentin decided to leave the church and moved to Louisiana, which was being purchased by the United States. He settled in New Orleans, Louisiana in 1803, and became a lawyer. He was a slave owner.

Fromentin was a member of the territorial house of representatives from 1807 to 1811. He was part of the constitutional convention that developed Louisiana's state constitution when it became a state in 1812. In 1813, he was elected to the United States Senate from Louisiana, and served for one term, retiring in 1819. He may have been the first former priest to serve in Congress. Fromentin was elected a member of the American Antiquarian Society in 1814.

Upon his retirement, Fromentin returned to Louisiana and became judge of the New Orleans criminal court in 1821. He soon left this position to become a federal judge for West Florida after being appointed by James Monroe. Fromentin was engaged in a conflict with Andrew Jackson, the Territorial Governor of Florida, as they disagreed over the boundaries of power between their offices, on how to best establish a new government, and because Jackson was wary of rumours of Fromentin's adultery and inability to pay debts. Fromentin most likely resigned as judge due to an incident involving the arrest of José María Callava, the former Spanish Governor of West Florida. Jackson accused Callava of trying to flee to Cuba with Spanish documents related to Florida. Fromentin's habeas corpus writ for Callava was also rejected by Jackson. Fromentin then returned to New Orleans, where he died the following year.

See also
List of United States senators born outside the United States

References

External links

United States senators from Louisiana
French emigrants to the United States
Louisiana state court judges
18th-century French Jesuits
1767 births
1822 deaths
Louisiana Democratic-Republicans
Democratic-Republican Party United States senators
Members of the American Antiquarian Society